Pau Toi Shan may refer to:
Fortress Hill, North Point, Hong Kong Island
Devil's Peak, Hong Kong, between New Kowloon and New Territories near Lei Yue Mun